Long Hill Township is a township in Morris County, New Jersey, United States.  As of the 2010 United States Census, the township's population was 8,702, reflecting a decline of 75 (−0.9%) from the 8,777 counted in the 2000 Census, which had in turn increased by 951 (+12.2%) from the 7,826 counted in the 1990 Census.

The township is situated in the southernmost part of Morris County bordering both Somerset and Union counties. Refuge lands also lie within neighboring Chatham and Harding townships. 

Originally incorporated as Passaic Township in the 1860s, residents voted to change the town's name to Long Hill Township in 1992. It includes the communities of Gillette, Stirling, Millington, Meyersville and Homestead Park. NJ Transit rail service is available at the Gillette, Millington and Stirling stations.

History

Long Hill Township was incorporated as Passaic Township on March 23, 1866. On September 1, 1922, part of what was then Passaic Township was taken to form Harding Township.

Garden State Fireworks, a firm based in Millington that dates back to 1890, has produced the annual July 4 fireworks show in Washington, D.C. on the National Mall. The Raptor Trust is a wild bird rehabilitation center located in Millington.

Clover Hill Swimming Club a club surrounding a lake in Millington, was the subject of lawsuit in which the Supreme Court of New Jersey ruled in 1966 that the club could not discriminate against an African American applicant for membership on the basis of the club being private.

Geography
According to the United States Census Bureau, the township had a total area of 12.06 square miles (31.22 km2), including 11.80 square miles (30.55 km2) of land and 0.26 square miles (0.67 km2) of water (2.14%).

Unincorporated communities, localities and place names located partially or completely within the township include Gillette, Millington, Stirling, Meyersville and Homestead Park a subdivision that was first developed in the 1920s.

The township is located in the most southern part of Morris County.  It is bounded by the Passaic River on the south and west and by the Great Swamp National Wildlife Refuge on the north.  It borders both Somerset and Union counties. The township borders the municipalities of Chatham Township and Harding Township in Morris County; Bernards Township and Warren Township in Somerset County, and Berkeley Heights in Union County.

Demographics

Census 2020 
The 2020 United States Census counted 8,629 people in 3,021 households. The Median household income was $136,542.

Census 2010

The Census Bureau's 2006–2010 American Community Survey showed that (in 2010 inflation-adjusted dollars) median household income was $120,691 (with a margin of error of ± $11,097) and the median family income was $142,059 (± $14,704). Males had a median income of $91,509 (± $24,098) versus $75,558 (± $11,204) for females. The per capita income for the borough was $54,508 (± $4,818). About 1.7% of families and 2.8% of the population were below the poverty line, including 3.0% of those under age 18 and 1.6% of those age 65 or over.

Census 2000
As of the 2000 United States Census there were 8,777 people, 3,139 households, and 2,457 families residing in the township.  The population density was 726.8 people per square mile (280.5/km2).  There were 3,206 housing units at an average density of 265.5 per square mile (102.5/km2).  The racial makeup of the township was 92.75% White, 0.39% African American, 0.17% Native American, 4.79% Asian, 0.03% Pacific Islander, 0.56% from other races, and 1.31% from two or more races. Hispanic or Latino of any race were 3.45% of the population.

There were 3,139 households, out of which 36.9% had children under the age of 18 living with them, 69.6% were married couples living together, 6.2% had a female householder with no husband present, and 21.7% were non-families. 18.2% of all households were made up of individuals, and 7.2% had someone living alone who was 65 years of age or older.  The average household size was 2.79 and the average family size was 3.19.

In the township the age distribution of the population shows 26.3% under the age of 18, 4.4% from 18 to 24, 31.2% from 25 to 44, 25.4% from 45 to 64, and 12.6% who were 65 years of age or older.  The median age was 39 years. For every 100 females, there were 94.2 males.  For every 100 females age 18 and over, there were 93.1 males.

The median income for a household in the township was $84,532, and the median income for a family was $103,037. Males had a median income of $71,827 versus $46,100 for females. The per capita income for the township was $42,613.  About 2.3% of families and 3.3% of the population were below the poverty line, including 1.7% of those under age 18 and 3.2% of those age 65 or over.

Government

Local government
Long Hill Township is governed under the Township form of New Jersey municipal government, one of 141 municipalities (of the 564) statewide that use this form, the second-most commonly used form of government in the state. The Township Committee is comprised of five members, who are elected directly by the voters at-large in partisan elections to serve three-year terms of office on a staggered basis, with either one or two seats coming up for election each year as part of the November general election in a three-year cycle. At an annual reorganization meeting held during the first week of January, the Township Committee selects one of its members to serve as Mayor and another as deputy mayor.

, the members of the township committee are Mayor Matthew C. Dorsi (R, term on committee ends December 31, 2023; term as mayor ends 2022), Deputy Mayor Guy Piserchia (R, term on committee ends 2024; term as deputy mayor ends 2022), Scott Lavender (R, 2023), Brendan Rae (R, 2024) and Victor T. Verlezza (R, 2022).

Federal, state, and county representation
Long Hill Township is located in the 7th Congressional District and is part of New Jersey's 21st state legislative district.

 

Morris County is governed by a Board of County Commissioners comprised of seven members who are elected at-large in partisan elections to three-year terms on a staggered basis, with either one or three seats up for election each year as part of the November general election. Actual day-to-day operation of departments is supervised by County Administrator, John Bonanni. , Morris County's Commissioners are
Commissioner Director Tayfun Selen (R, Chatham Township, term as commissioner ends December 31, 2023; term as director ends 2022),
Commissioner Deputy Director John Krickus (R, Washington Township, term as commissioner ends 2024; term as deputy director ends 2022),
Douglas Cabana (R, Boonton Township, 2022), 
Kathryn A. DeFillippo (R, Roxbury, 2022),
Thomas J. Mastrangelo (R, Montville, 2022),
Stephen H. Shaw (R, Mountain Lakes, 2024) and
Deborah Smith (R, Denville, 2024).
The county's constitutional officers are the County Clerk and County Surrogate (both elected for five-year terms of office) and the County Sheriff (elected for a three-year term). , they are 
County Clerk Ann F. Grossi (R, Parsippany–Troy Hills, 2023),
Sheriff James M. Gannon (R, Boonton Township, 2022) and
Surrogate Heather Darling (R, Roxbury, 2024).

Politics

As of March 23, 2011, there were a total of 5,854 registered voters in Long Hill Township, of which 1,154 (19.7%) were registered as Democrats, 2,245 (38.3%) were registered as Republicans and 2,450 (41.9%) were registered as Unaffiliated. There were 5 voters registered as Libertarians or Greens.

In the 2012 presidential election, Republican Mitt Romney received 60.2% of the vote (2,605 cast), ahead of Democrat Barack Obama with 39.0% (1,690 votes), and other candidates with 0.8% (34 votes), among the 4,347 ballots cast by the township's 6,187 registered voters (18 ballots were spoiled), for a turnout of 70.3%. In the 2008 presidential election, Republican John McCain received 57.0% of the vote (2,789 cast), ahead of Democrat Barack Obama with 41.4% (2,024 votes) and other candidates with 1.2% (60 votes), among the 4,894 ballots cast by the township's 6,155 registered voters, for a turnout of 79.5%. In the 2004 presidential election, Republican George W. Bush received 59.8% of the vote (2,808 ballots cast), outpolling Democrat John Kerry with 39.0% (1,833 votes) and other candidates with 0.7% (43 votes), among the 4,696 ballots cast by the township's 6,112 registered voters, for a turnout percentage of 76.8.

In the 2013 gubernatorial election, Republican Chris Christie received 75.0% of the vote (2,173 cast), ahead of Democrat Barbara Buono with 23.7% (686 votes), and other candidates with 1.3% (37 votes), among the 2,932 ballots cast by the township's 6,142 registered voters (36 ballots were spoiled), for a turnout of 47.7%. In the 2009 gubernatorial election, Republican Chris Christie received 64.4% of the vote (2,284 ballots cast), ahead of Democrat Jon Corzine with 24.4% (865 votes), Independent Chris Daggett with 10.1% (358 votes) and other candidates with 0.4% (14 votes), among the 3,546 ballots cast by the township's 6,058 registered voters, yielding a 58.5% turnout.

Education

The Long Hill Township School System serves public school students in pre-kindergarten through eighth grade. As of the 2019–2020 school year, the district, comprised of three schools, had an enrollment of 894 students and 80.6 classroom teachers (on an FTE basis), for a student–teacher ratio of 11.1:1. Schools in the district (with 2019–2020 enrollment data from the National Center for Education Statistics) are 
Gillette School with 223 students in grades Pre-K–1, 
Millington School with 397 students in grades 2–5 and 
Central Middle School with 269 students in grades 6–8.

Long Hill Township's high school students in public school for ninth through twelfth grades attend Watchung Hills Regional High School in Warren Township.  Students from Long Hill Township and from the neighboring communities of Green Brook Township, Warren Township and Watchung (in Somerset County) attend the school. As of the 2019–2020 school year, the high school had an enrollment of 1,948 students and 160.6 classroom teachers (on an FTE basis), for a student–teacher ratio of 12.1:1. The high school district's board of education has nine members, who are elected directly by the voters to serve three-year terms of office on a staggered basis, with three seats up for each year. Of the nine elected seats, three are allocated to Long Hill Township.

St. Vincent de Paul School was a Catholic school in Stirling that operated under the auspices of the Roman Catholic Diocese of Paterson. The school closed in June 2016 in the wake of declining enrollment and financial challenges. The school was recognized with the Blue Ribbon School Award of Excellence in 2012.

Library
The Long Hill Township Library began about 1880 in what was then known as Passaic Township.  At the time a group of women in Millington formed a reading club purchasing a small number of books to trade amongst themselves.  A similar group was established in Meyersville. In 1920, when the Morris County Library was built, the groups joined the county system and books on loan from the county were housed in the homes of the associations' members.

By the 1950s, the Millington Association's Library had relocated to the Town Hall and the Meyersville group occupied one room in the town's Central School.  In 1956, however, the Township asked the Millington Association to find other quarters, and the Central School location had steadily become less than satisfactory due to increasing enrollment.  A referendum in the amount of $25,000 for the construction of a new building was submitted to the community. The measure passed by two votes.  The new library opened in 1958 on Central Avenue in Stirling as the Passaic Township Free Public Library with a paid director and several volunteers.

By 1968, the library's collection had grown substantially and plans were made for a new addition to the building. Another $25,000 was raised and the addition was completed in 1972.  A later addition followed in the 1980s. The library remained on Central Avenue until 2005 when an entirely new building was dedicated in April of that year.  After the township formally changed its name to Long Hill Township in 1992, the Passaic Township Free Public Library was renamed as the Long Hill Township Free Public Library.

The Long Hill Township Library now occupies a site in Gillette, adjacent to Township Hall. The library contains  of space and has a capacity for 72,000 books.  The library is a member of the Morris Automated Information Network consortium, which offers residents of Long Hill Township have access to library materials at 37 area libraries. It also hosts a professional concert series.

Transportation

Roads and highways

No Interstate, U.S. or state highways directly serve Long Hill Township. The most prominent roads within the township are county routes, including County Route 512 and County Route 531. Interstate 78 and Interstate 287 are both nearby and cross adjacent municipalities.

Public transportation
NJ Transit rail service is available at the Gillette, Millington and Stirling stations, offering service on the Gladstone Branch to Newark Broad Street Station and Hoboken Terminal.

NJ Transit offered service on the MCM8 route until 2010, when subsidies offered to the local provider were eliminated as part of budget cuts.

Lakeland Bus Lines provides Route 78 rush-hour service from Bedminster to the Port Authority Bus Terminal in Midtown Manhattan.

Communications
Long Hill is in Area code 908.  The legacy exchange is 908–647 (Millington 7), is one of the last manual offices in New Jersey converted dial operation in the early 1960s.

The current cable company serving the area is Comcast which provides local TV, internet, and phone service.  Most of Long Hill now also has access to Verizon's FiOS service. Original cable company Patriot Media was sold to Comcast in early 2008.

Long Hill Township operates a public service television channel on Comcast (Channel 25) and Verizon (Channel 37).

Long Hill Television
A Government-access television (GATV) cable TV channel is available for citizens of Long Hill Township that has important news updates, local activities, local weather, storm warnings, etc. It is on Comcast channel 29 (all programming) and Verizon FiOS channels 37 (public meetings and programs) and 38 (community bulletin board).

Notable people

People who were born in, residents of, or otherwise closely associated with Long Hill Township include:

 Jessie Baylin (born 1984), singer-songwriter
 David Bird (–2014), journalist and longtime reporter at The Wall Street Journal, whose work "was instrumental in the expansion of energy markets reporting in the 1990s
 George B. Cooper (1808–1866), politician who was elected to the United States House of Representatives in 1858, but left office after a year when Congress awarded the seat to his opponent in 1860
 George Estock (1924–2010), MLB pitcher who played for the Boston Braves in 1951
 Eugenio Fernandi (1922–1991), operatic tenor
 Jack H. Jacobs (born 1945), Medal of Honor recipient in 1969 for his heroic actions during the Vietnam War
 Robert Tappan Morris (born 1965), computer scientist and entrepreneur best known for creating the Morris Worm in 1988, considered the first computer worm on the Internet
 Bill Murray (born 1997), guard for the New England Patriots

References

External links

Long Hill Township website
Long Hill Township School System

School Data for the Long Hill Township School System, National Center for Education Statistics
Watchung Hills Regional High School website
Macaroni Kid Warren website of local kids' events

 
1866 establishments in New Jersey
Populated places established in 1866
Township form of New Jersey government
Townships in Morris County, New Jersey